Awais Iqbal (born 12 December 1996) is a Pakistani cricketer. He made his List A debut for Rawalpindi in the 2018–19 Quaid-e-Azam One Day Cup on 30 September 2018.

References

External links
 

1996 births
Living people
Pakistani cricketers
Rawalpindi cricketers
Place of birth missing (living people)